The International Association of Dry Cargo Shipowners, (INTERCARGO) is an association that represents the interests of owners, operators and managers within the dry cargo shipping industry. Since 1980, INTERCARGO has worked closely with other international associations to promote a safe, high quality, efficient, environmentally friendly, and profitable dry cargo shipping industry. 

INTERCARGO has Consultative status within the International Maritime Organization.

References

External links
 

Dry Cargo